Bethel Presbyterian Church is a historic Presbyterian church at 7132 Old St. Marys Pike in Waverly, Wood County, West Virginia.  The brick Gothic Revival structure was built in 1904, replacing an earlier wood-frame building.  It is the only surviving rural brick church in Wood County.

The church building was listed on the National Register of Historic Places in 2014.

See also
National Register of Historic Places listings in Wood County, West Virginia

References

Presbyterian churches in West Virginia
Churches in Wood County, West Virginia
Carpenter Gothic church buildings in West Virginia
Churches on the National Register of Historic Places in West Virginia
Churches completed in 1904
National Register of Historic Places in Wood County, West Virginia